Saeed Al Ghafri (Arabic:سعيد الغافري) (born 7 July 1996) is an Emirati footballer. He currently plays as a forward for Al-Rams.

Career
Al Ghafri started his career at Emirates Club and is a product of the Emirates's youth system. On 2 February 2018, Al Ghafri made his professional debut for Emirates Club against Shabab Al-Ahli in the Pro League, replacing Ahmed Malallah.

External links

References

1996 births
Living people
Emirati footballers
Emirates Club players
Al Rams Club players
UAE Pro League players
UAE First Division League players
Association football forwards
Place of birth missing (living people)